The Football League is the second division of the professional football system of Greece. The 2011–12 Football League was held for the second year under the name Football League after previously being known as Beta Ethniki. 

The regular season began late, on 29 October, due to the Koriopolis scandal and the relegation of five teams for various offences. Promotion play-offs are scheduled to take place immediately afterwards, while the relegation play-outs were abolished by decision of 8 December 2011.

Teams
A total of three teams gained promotion to the 2011–12 Super League after the 2010–11 Football League season. Champions Panetolikos and runners-up PAS Giannina were directly promoted, and the remaining spot was taken by promotion play-off group winners OFI. The teams that replaced the three promoted teams were initially Iraklis, after it was found guilty of forgery during the winter transfer window, AEL and Panserraikos. Later however, Iraklis got stripped from its professional licence and got relegated to the Delta Ethniki. Also, Levadiakos and Doxa Drama gained promotion to the 2011–12 Super League to take the place of Olympiacos Volos and Kavala which were relegated due to Koriopolis scandal.
For the same scandal Panachaiki was docked five points on 24 October 2011.

On the bottom end of the table, Ethnikos Piraeus, Ionikos, Anagennisi Karditsa and Trikala were demoted to the 2011–12 Delta Ethniki after having been found guilty of forgery during the winter transfer window. Ilioupoli was found guilty of match-fixing, so it was automatically put at the end of the league table and demoted to the Football League 2. The relegated teams were replaced by 2010–11 Football League 2 South champions Panachaiki, North champions Anagennisi Epanomi, South runner-up Vyzas, North runner-up Kalloni, Iraklis Psachna, Fokikos, Platanias and Anagennisi Giannitsa.

League table

Results

Promotion play-offs
The promotion play-offs will comprise the teams ranked 3rd through 6th during the regular season, and they are scheduled to take place immediately after the conclusion of the regular season.

Top scorers

Updated to games played on 16 May 2012.

References

External links
news & stats

Second level Greek football league seasons
Greece
2